Maximilian Thomas Charles Waller (born 3 March 1988) is a former English professional cricketer. He was a right-handed batsman and a leg break bowler. He played first-class, List A and Twenty20 cricket for Somerset County Cricket Club.

Waller played through the Somerset Age Groups whilst he was a pupil at Millfield School, where he had a successful career, ending up as Captain of the 1st XI.

In 2007 and 2008 he played for Somerset 2nd XI where he bowled his leg breaks with considerable success and made his 1st XI debut the following season in the 2009 Twenty20 competition and played in 10 matches before making his Championship debut and playing in four matches. He was awarded a two-year contract and spent the winter of 2009–10 on the ECB Performance Programme.

In 2010 and 2011 Waller did not play any Championship cricket but appeared in eight CB40 and fifteen T20 matches.

In 2011 Waller was named the 2nd XI Player of the Year. In 2012 he played in three First Class matches taking his best bowling analysis of 3 for 33 against Cardiff MCCU at Taunton Vale. He also claimed his best T20 figures of 4 for 16.

In 2013 Waller didn't play any First Class cricket, but appeared in nine YB40 matches, hitting a career best score of 25 not out to help steer Somerset to victory over Glamorgan at Taunton and he took a career best 3 for 39 against Middlesex, also at Taunton. He also appeared in ten T20 matches.

In 2014 Waller played in 12 T20 matches in which he took 12 wickets.

2015 saw Waller appearing in four List A games in which he took five wickets at 22 runs each and 12 T20 matches taking 9 wickets with a best of 3 for 17.

In 2016 Waller's appearances for the First XI were once again limited to one day cricket.

In T20 he was the second highest wicket-taker with 12 at an average 24.17, with a best of 4 for 33 in addition to which he was dynamic in the field and took seven catches, while in the RLODC he claimed five wickets and took six catches.

2017 saw Waller continue his run in white ball cricket, taking 16 wickets in the NatWest T20 Blast, including a career best of 3 for 37, as well as displaying amazing athleticism in the field.

Somerset qualified for the T20 Blast finals day in 2018, with Waller taking 16 wickets in 16 games with an impressive economy rate of 6.78 runs per over. 
Waller also claimed his 100th wicket for the club in T20 cricket and becomes only the second person to achieve this feat after Alfonso Thomas.

In February 2019, Waller was signed by Pakistan Super League side Quetta Gladiators as cover for the injured Sunil Narine.

At the end of the 2022 season, Waller announced his retirement from professional cricket, as the leading all time wicket taker for Somerset in T20 cricket.

References

External links

1988 births
Alumni of Bournemouth University
Dorset cricketers
English cricketers
Living people
People educated at Millfield
Somerset cricketers
Quetta Gladiators cricketers